Kallmünz is a municipality in the district of Regensburg in Bavaria, Germany. Located on Naab River about 25 km north of Regensburg, Kallmünz has preserved a beautiful medieval center. The main attractions are the ruins of the Kallmünz Castle above the town on a cliff and the old stone bridge over the Naab River. The Russian painter Wassily Kandinsky and the German expressionist painter Gabriele Münter met in Kallmünz during the summer of 1903. Since then, Kallmünz has been the constant home of a small art colony.

Kallmünz Castle, the seat of the former Counts of Kallmünz, has been fortified since the Bronze Age. Kallmünz also has a medieval bridge bearing masons' marks over the Naab River.

References

External links
 Official website (German)

Regensburg (district)